Rosenblumvirus (synonyms: AHJD-like viruses, Ahjdlikevirus) is a genus of viruses in the order Caudovirales, in the family Rountreeviridae (formerly in Podoviridae), in the subfamily Rakietenvirinae (formerly Picovirinae). Gram positive bacteria serve as natural hosts, with transmission achieved through passive diffusion. There are 12 species in this genus.

Taxonomy
The following species are recognized:
 Staphylococcus virus 66
 Staphylococcus virus 44AHJD
 Staphylococcus virus BP39
 Staphylococcus virus CSA13
 Staphylococcus virus GRCS
 Staphylococcus virus Pabna
 Staphylococcus virus phiAGO13
 Staphylococcus virus PSa3
 Staphylococcus virus S24-1
 Staphylococcus virus SAP2
 Staphylococcus virus SCH1
 Staphylococcus virus SLPW

Structure
Rosenblumviruses are nonenveloped, with a head and tail. The head has icosahedral symmetry (T=4) approximately 54 nm in diameter. The tail is non-contractile and has a collar with twelve appendages. The diameter is around 55 nm, with a length of 27 nm. Genomes are linear, around 20kb in length.

Genome
Some viruses' genomes have been fully sequenced and are available on NCBI's website. They range between 16k and 17k nucleotides, with 20 to 21 proteins. Complete genomes, as well as additional "unclassified" virus genomes, are available here

Life cycle
The virus attaches to the host cell adhesion receptors using its tail fibers, and ejects the viral DNA into the host periplasm. Viral replication is cytoplasmic. DNA-templated transcription is the method of transcription. Once the viral DNA has been replicated, the procapsid is assembled and packed, and the tail is assembled. Finally, the mature virions are released via lysis.

History
According to ICTV's ninth report in 2009, the genus Ahjdlikevirus was first accepted under the name AHJD-like viruses. In 2012, the genus was renamed to Ahjdlikevirus. The genus was later renamed to Rosenblumvirus.

References

Podoviridae
Virus genera